IUP Crimson Hawks men's basketball team is a Division II basketball program who represents Indiana University of Pennsylvania. The program has been in the NCAA Division II Men's Basketball Championship ten times in its history going to the final four, four times and coming up short in the championship game twice in 2010 and 2015. The team's first season was 1927-28 when the team went 4-9.

The Crimson Hawks play their home games at Kovalchick Convention and Athletic Complex in Indiana, Pennsylvania. They are currently coached by Joe Lombardi. In 2010, Joe Lombardi was named the Basketball Times Division II Coach of the Year, following the team's finish as national runner-up.

History
The program's inaugural season was in 1927. The team has played every season since 1927 except two seasons during World War II due to the players needing to enlist.

Season by season record
The overall record of this program is 1354–753.

Program leaders
Note All numbers as of November 1, 2016
Bold still active 

Points
 Darryl Webb (1,949)
 Robert Misenko (1,715)
 Brandon Norfleet (1,678)
 Julian Sanders (1,655)
 Ashton Smith (1,635)

Games Played
 Devon Cottrell (141)
 Ashton Smith (127)
 Darryl Webb (126)
 Julian Sanders (124)
 Jason Bullock (119)

Assists 
 Devante Chance (512)
 Ashton Smith (456)
 Mont Mattocks (450)
 Eddie Peterson (425)
 Yancey Taylor (406)

Rebounds 
 Darryl Webb (1,214)
 Garry Lupek (881)
 Lee McCullough (877)
 Robert Misenko (826)
 Sam Scott (738)

Coaching history
The Crimson Hawks have had a history of eight head coaches. The current head coach is Joe Lonbardi.

Retired numbers

Championships and tournament runs

PSAC championships
Source
PSAC Championships (10): 1960, 1974, 1995, 2000, 2002, 2004, 2010–11, 2013, 2019, 2022
PSAC Tournament Appearances (30): 1961, 1974, 1981–82, 1984–87, 1993-2002, 2004–06, 2008–19, 2022
PSAC West Championships (14): 1974, 1981–82, 1994–95, 2002, 2005, 2010–14, 2016–19, 2022

NCAA tournament
NCAA Tournament Appearances (17): 1994-96, 2000, 2002, 2004–05, 2009–15, 2017, 2019, 2022
NCAA Sweet Sixteen Appearances (8): 1994-95, 2000, 2002, 2010–11, 2013, 2015
NCAA Elite Eight Appearances (6): 1994-95, 2000, 2002, 2010, 2015
NCAA Final Four Appearances (4): 1995, 2002, 2010, 2015
NCAA Championship Game Appearances (2): 2010, 2015

Record vs D1 opponents
The Crimson Hawks have played nine NCAA Division I men's basketball teams going 1–11 in 12 games played all scheduled as exhibition games. The Crimson Hawks led going into half time once in 2012 vs Maryland leading 23–21 then being outscored 52 to 38 in the second have and tied once at 37 points with South Florida in 2014. IUP's only win vs Division I opponent came against Bucknell when Kevin Stewert hit a game-winning three pointer.

References

External links
Official website

 
Indiana University of Pennsylvania